= Bust of Anton Chekhov =

Sculpture by Vera Morozova

Аnton Chekhov’s bust
- Russian: Бюст Антона Чехова
- Interactive map of Аnton Chekhov’s bust
- Location: Chekhov’s st., 29, Taganrog, Rostov Oblast, Russia
- Designer: Vera Morozova
- Material: tinted plaster
- Length: 104 cm (41 in)
- Completion date: 1935
- Opening date: 1927

Anton Chekhov’s bust is the sculptural image which was created by Vera Morozova in 1935. It was installed in Taganrog and considered to be the first Chekhov’s sculptural imagine in the Soviet Union.

== Bust ==
The bust was installed in the courtyard of Chekhov’s house to the left of the main alley. It is made of tinted plaster. The height of the bust – 104 cm. The pedestal is made of plastered brick and its height is also 104 cm.

== The history of creation ==
Vera Morozova started her work in Taganrog, where she arrived in 1931 after her husband Alexander Morrison who was an editor-in-chief of the local newspaper “The Don truth”. Morozova was a self-taught-sculptor, she didn't have special education.

Alexander Morozov was engaged in preparation celebrations dedicated to Chekhov's anniversary in Taganrog. Morrison travelled in Moscow to N. Bugharin for the coordination issues of the 75th Chekhov's anniversary. The work of the bust had been continued for two years since 1933 up to 1935. The bust was made in clay and the plastered form was made from it. The bust was carved into stone for the Chekhov's anniversary.

== Grand Opening ==
The opening was in 1935 during the celebrations dedicated to the 75th Chekhov's anniversary. It was with a large number of people in the presence of Maria Chekhova, Olga Knipper-Chekhova, Alexander Vishnevsky, AllaTarasova, Valentina Kataeva and others.

== Famous copies of the bust ==
- At the existing models of the best at the factory "The Red Copper-smith" in May 1944 was cast the bronze copy, which had been installed and then removed from the Taganrog Red Square in 1960, before the monument by Rukavischnikov was put there.
- Later the second monument was made for Chekhov's school No.2, which had been installed at the entrance of the school in 1950.
